Asleep at the Wheel is an American country band based in Austin, Texas. Formed in Paw Paw, West Virginia in 1970, the group originally consisted of vocalist and guitarist Ray Benson, vocalist and drummer LeRoy Preston, steel guitarist Lucky Oceans, bassist Rob Silver, and pianist Danny Levin, who were joined later by bassist Gene Dobkin, and vocalist and guitarist Chris O'Connell. The band's current lineup includes Benson alongside vocalist and fiddler Katie Shore (since 2014), fiddler and mandolinist Dennis Ludiker (since 2016), pianist and keyboardist Connor Forsyth (since 2016), bassist Josh Hoag (since 2017), steel guitarist Flavio Pasquetto (since 2019), drummer Jason Baczynski (since 2020), and saxophonist Joey Colarusso (since 2021).

History

1970–1980
Asleep at the Wheel (AATW) was originally formed in January 1970 in Paw Paw, West Virginia. The band's initial lineup featured lead vocalist and guitarist Ray Benson, second vocalist and drummer LeRoy Preston, pedal and lap steel guitarist Lucky Oceans (real name Reuben Gosfield), and pianist Danny Levin. By the time they made their live debut a few months after forming, the band included Gene Dobkin on upright and electric bass, replacing Richard Fitzhugh who left after he "kind of went nuts", according to Benson. By the end of the year the group had added two female backing vocalists, Chris O'Connell and Emily Paxton, although the latter had to leave after a few months due to "family matters". In August 1971, the band relocated to Oakland, California and Levin remained in West Virginia.

After adding pianist Floyd Domino (real name Jim Haber) to the lineup in 1972, AATW signed with United Artists Records and issued its debut album Comin' Right at Ya the following year. In February 1974, the group moved to Austin, Texas. Dobkin was replaced by Tony Garnier, Richard Casanova joined on fiddle, and in the summer the group released its self-titled second album on Epic Records. The next year saw the release of Texas Gold on Capitol Records, featuring original pianist Levin returning on fiddle, new drummer Scott Hennige (Preston switched to rhythm guitar) and saxophonist Ed Vizard. For the 1976 album Wheelin' and Dealin', the group added second fiddler Bill Mabry and replaced Vizard with Link Davis Jr. Shortly after its release, Chris York replaced Hennige and Pat "Taco" Ryan joined on saxophone.

Two years and two more albums (The Wheel and Collision Course) for Capitol later, AATW suffered its first major lineup change in September 1978 when Preston, Domino and Mabry all left the band. Johnny Nicholas took over rhythm guitar and piano duties, and the band reduced to a nine-piece lineup. By December the group was an eight-piece following the departure of Davis, while Garnier and York had been replaced by Spencer Starnes and Fran Christina, respectively. After the band released its first live album Served Live, Starnes was replaced by Dean DeMerritt. Shortly thereafter, Lucky Oceans left the band to move to Australia with his family.

1980–2000
In early 1980, AATW added vocalist Maryann Price and replaced steel guitarist Lucky Oceans with Bobby Black. Later in the year, O'Connell took a temporary leave of absence from full-time touring, and was replaced by Brenda Burns. Several members left after a show on the final day of 1980, including Johnny Nicholas. The group returned in early 1981 with new members Dan Tyack on pedal steel guitar, Falkner Evans on piano, Billy Estes on drums and Paul Anastasio on fiddle. By the summer, Burns, Tyack, Estes and Pat "Taco" Ryan had been replaced by Jann Browne, Wally Murphy, Steve Schwelling and Michael Francis, respectively.

By summer 1982, the lineup of AATW featured Anastasio's brother Tom on bass and Roy McCrory on drums. Richard Hormachea replaced McCrory a few months later. Browne had left by 1983 as O'Connell returned full-time, and during 1984 Billy Cochran replaced Paul Anastasio. By early 1985, the band featured Junior Brown on lap steel guitar, Tim Alexander on piano, Mike Grammar on drums and Larry Franklin on fiddle. That year, the band issued Pasture Prime, its first album in five years, which featured contributions from several of the 1981–85 lineups. In 1986, O'Connell left AATW after becoming pregnant with her second child.

Later in 1986, AATW signed with Epic Records again and recorded 10, which saw the debut of steel guitarist John Ely, bassist David Dawson and drummer David Sanger. In summer 1988, Dawson was replaced by Jon Mitchell. Ricky Turpin took over from Franklin in 1991, and shortly after the release of Greatest Hits: Live & Kickin' the next year, Ely, Mitchell and Sanger were replaced by Cindy Cashdollar, David Miller and Tommy Beavers, respectively. Tribute to the Music of Bob Wills and the Texas Playboys followed in 1993, after which Barbara Lamb of Ranch Romance replaced Turpin and Sanger returned on drums. After the release of The Wheel Keeps on Rollin' in 1995, Lamb was replaced by Monty Gaylord. Jason Roberts (fiddle, mandolin) and Chris Booher (piano, fiddle) joined AATW the next year, followed by Rosie Flores (vocals, rhythm guitar) in April 1997. After Flores departed, the band issued Merry Texas Christmas, Y'all in 1997 and a second tribute album, Ride with Bob, in 1999.

2000–2019
By the spring of 2000, John Michael Whitby had taken over from Chris Booher on piano. After the release of The Very Best of Asleep at the Wheel in 2001, Cindy Cashdollar left to pursue other projects. She was replaced by Jim Murphy. Later in the year, long-term saxophonist Michael Francis also left, with Murphy taking over saxophone duties. In early 2003, Haydn Vitera joined to give the band a two-fiddler lineup for the first time since 1978, debuting on that year's Live at Billy Bob's Texas and Remembers the Alamo. Eddie Rivers replaced Murphy in June 2004. Just under a year later, Vitera left and Elizabeth McQueen joined as second vocalist and guitarist.

In late 2006, Walt Roberts joined on second fiddle, although less than a year later he had left again. Also in 2007, former pianist Floyd Domino returned to the band. The group collaborated with Willie Nelson on Willie and the Wheel in 2009, and later in the year Dan Walton took over from Domino. In January 2014, McQueen left to raise her children and was replaced by Katie Shore, who also played second fiddle. Jason Roberts left a few months later, at which point Shore became the primary fiddler in the group. Around the same time, pianist Emily Gimble (the granddaughter of fiddler Johnny Gimble) and saxophonist/clarinetist Jay Reynolds joined the band.

After the release of a third Bob Wills tribute album, Still the King, AATW became an eight-piece again with the addition of lead fiddler and mandolinist Dennis Ludiker in January 2016, followed by Connor Forsyth replacing Gimble in May. By 2017, Josh Hoag had also joined on bass, marking the end of David Earl Miller's 25-year tenure in the band. The band issued New Routes in 2018, its first album of new material since Reinventing the Wheel in 2006. In June 2019, Eddie Rivers retired and Jay Reynolds left; they were replaced temporarily by returning steel guitarist Cindy Cashdollar (and later Lucky Oceans) and saxophonist Chloe Feoranzo, respectively.

Since 2019
In September 2019, Italian steel guitarist Flavio Pasquetto joined AATW as the full-time replacement for the retired Rivers. Late the following year, long-time drummer David Sanger was replaced by Jason Baczynski. Starting with the band's 50th anniversary shows in 2021, Joey Colarusso joined on saxophones.

Members

Current

Former

Timeline

Lineups

References

Footnotes

External links
Asleep at the Wheel official website

Asleep at the Wheel